Wawona and 46th Avenue station (also known as SF Zoo) is a light rail stop on the Muni Metro L Taraval line, located in the Parkside neighborhood of San Francisco, California. The stop opened as the terminus of an extension of the line to the San Francisco Zoo on September 15, 1937. It has a single side platform (a transit bulb that is part of the sidewalk) serving a single-track loop. A mini-high platform provides access to people with disabilities.

Service 
Since August 2020, service along the route is temporarily being provided by buses to allow for the construction of improvements to the L Taraval line. The project is expected to wrap up in 2024.

References

External links 

SFMTA – Wawona St & 46th Ave (SF Zoo)
SFBay Transit (unofficial) – Wawona/46th Ave /SF Zoo

Muni Metro stations
Railway stations in the United States opened in 1937